Vilar
This is a list of Korean surnames, in Hangul alphabetical order. Note: (N) denotes North Korea; (S) denotes South Korea. 

The most common Korean surname (particularly in South Korea) is Kim, followed by Lee and Park. These three family names are held by around half of the ethnic Korean population. , 286 Korean family names were in use. However, each family name is divided into one or more clans (bon-gwan) and to identify a person's family name, the identification of a person's clan is needed.

See also
 Family register (Hangul: 호주, Hanja: 戶主)
 Korean culture
 Korean language
 Korean name
 List of common Chinese surnames

References

External links
  Degrees of Courtesy and Communication Styles in the Korean Language, by K. B. Kurotchenko.
Image of pie graph showing the most prevalent names, in Hangul and Hanja
The links below are solely in Korean.
List including vanished names, with clan profiles.
List of living names, with clan profiles.
List of names with Naver Encyclopedia entries.
2000 South Korean census results data by surname and clan.
2000 South Korean census results by surname and clan.
2000 South Korean census results by surname, sorted.
2015 South Korean lists of Family name.
South Korean statistics portal site.

Family names
Family names
surnames